John Fleeting, real name Claude Stuart Fleeting (1908 – 24 March 1984), was an Australian actor best known for his film appearances for Ken G. Hall.

In 1936, he appeared in an amateur production of The Last of Mrs Cheyney alongside Shirley Ann Richards. Both were seen by a talent scout from Cinesound Productions. He was subsequently seen by Ken G. Hall in the play Men without Wives and Hall cast him as the romantic male lead in Gone to the Dogs.

He grew up in Manildra. Fleeting served in the Australian army during World War II from 1940-46. He was given leave to appear in 100,000 Cobbers.

Select theatre credits
I'll Leave It to You by Noël Coward – Savoy Theatre, Sydney(1935)
The Last of Mrs Cheyney –  Savoy Theatre, Sydney 1936
Men without Wives – Sydney Players Club 1938

Filmography
Gone to the Dogs (1939)
Ants in His Pants (1939)
Forty Thousand Horsemen (1940)
100,000 Cobbers (1943) (short)
Smithy (1946)

References

External links

Claude Fleeting at AusStage

Australian male actors
1908 births
1984 deaths